Saqqarsuaq Fjord is a fjord of Greenland. It is located in the Upernavik Archipelago.

Fjords of the Upernavik Archipelago